Ravula Chandrasekhar Reddy is a politician from Telugu Desam Party who is a former member of the legislative assembly representing Wanaparthy constituency in Telangana State. He also served as a Member of Parliament of the Rajya Sabha from Mahbubnagar.

Personal life 
He hails from Kanaipally, Wanaparthy district, Telangana state. He is the brother of Dr. Ravula Ravindranath Reddy, ex-MLA for Alampur constituency.

Political career 
He joined Telugu Desam Party in 1982. He was elected as an MLA of Wanaparthy in 1994 Andhra Pradesh elections and 2009 Andhra Pradesh elections. He won twice on ex Minister Dr. G. Chinna Reddy. He served as the Member of Parliament, Rajya Sabha from Mahbubnagar. He was the Telugu Desam Party candidate in the 2018 Telangana elections. He is currently the general secretary of the Telugu Desam Party Telangana state unit.

References

External links
 Profile on Rajya Sabha website

People from Telangana
Telangana politicians
Telugu Desam Party politicians
Rajya Sabha members from Andhra Pradesh
Telugu politicians
Living people
Telangana MLAs 2014–2018
1948 births
People from Wanaparthy district